Johann Christoph Altnickol, or Altnikol, (baptised 1 January 1720, buried 25 July 1759) was a German organist, bass singer, and composer. He was a student, copyist and son-in-law of Johann Sebastian Bach.

Biography
Altnikol was born in Berna bei Seidenberg, Oberlausitz, and first educated at the Lauban Lyceum in 1733. He was employed as a singer and assistant organist at St Maria Magdalena, Breslau, between 1740 and 1744. He began studying theology at the University of Leipzig from March 1744, after being granted four thalers as a viaticum in January of that year. From Michaelmas 1745 he sang as a bass in Johann Sebastian Bach's choirs (asserted by Bach in May 1747 when Altnickol claimed a grant of 12 thalers in April/May 1747 for the work), something he should not have been allowed to do as a university student. He also served as a scribe for Bach, copying for example The Well-Tempered Clavier. He was recommended by W. F. Bach as the successor to his post at Dresden in April 1746, with the assertion that he had studied keyboard and composition with his father, but was not awarded the appointment.

He was appointed as organist and schoolmaster at Niederwiesa, near Greiffenberg, Silesia, in January 1748, after Bach testified that he was a satisfactory student. In September of that year, he moved to a post at St Wenzel, Naumburg, after another recommendation from Bach; the council unanimously agreed to appoint him before they had received his formal application. He married Bach's daughter Elisabeth Juliane Friederica in January 1749; their first son was born in October of the same year and named Johann Sebastian, but died in infancy. Forkel wrote that Bach dictated his last chorale prelude (Vor deinen Thron tret ich hiermit, BWV 668) to Altnickol on his deathbed, although this manuscript did not survive.

Altnikol acted as a trustee after Bach died in 1750, and was involved in distributing his estate. He took his brother-in-law Gottfried Heinrich Bach, believed to have been mentally handicapped, into his household, and also took on the teaching of J. G. Müthel. He was unsuccessful in an application for a post at the Johanniskirche, Zittau, in 1753, along with W. F. Bach. He taught trumpeter J. Ernst Altenburg in 1757, and is known to have directed a pasticcio Passion cantata Wer ist der, so von Edom kömmt, featuring music by C. H. Graun, Bach and Telemann, as well as Bach's St. Matthew Passion. He was succeeded by Johann Friedrich Gräbner at Naumburg upon his death in 1759. His widow lived on an allowance from C. P. E. Bach, her half-brother. She is known to have remained in Naumburg until 1763, when her brother Gottfried Heinrich died; she later moved back to Leipzig, where her two daughters married; she died on 24 August 1781.

Compositions
Many of his works  have been lost.

Vocal
 Missa in D minor (Kyrie and Gloria)
 Sanctus (2 settings), 1748

Cantatas
 Frohlocket und jauchzet in prächtigen Chören
 Ich lebe und ihr sollt auch leben

Motets
 Befiehl du deine Wege
 Nun danket alle Gott (SSATB), partly based on BWV 386.

Keyboard
Sonata in C major
7 dances
Ricercar a 4

Further reading
W. Neumann and H.J. Schulz, eds.: Bach-Dokumente I–III (Kassel and Leipzig, 1963–1972)
Alfred Dürr. "Zur Chronologie der Handschrift Johann Christoph Altnikols und Johann Friedrich Agricolas". In: Bach-Jahrbuch, Vol. 56. Evangelische Verlagsanstalt publisher, Leipzig 1970, .
Peter Wollny: "Eine apokryphe Bachsche Passionsmusik in der Handschrift Johann Christoph Altnickols". In Leipziger Beiträge zur Bach-Forschung I (1995)

References

Sources 
Walter Emery/Andreas Glöckner: 'Altnickol [Altnikol], Johann Christoph', Grove Music Online ed. L. Macy (Accessed 2007-06-13), http://www.grovemusic.com/ 
 
 
 
  (subscription)

External links
 
 

German male classical composers
German classical composers
German Baroque composers
German classical organists
German male organists
Bach family
1719 births
1759 deaths
Pupils of Johann Sebastian Bach
Leipzig University alumni
18th-century classical composers
18th-century male musicians
18th-century musicians
18th-century keyboardists
Male classical organists